WebAssign is an American educational company which provides online homework application for faculty and students.

Online instruction
WebAssign is one service among several online homework system providers. This particular service was developed, launched, and is hosted at North Carolina State University.

WebAssign's core function is to load end-of-chapter questions from various textbooks into its archives, from which instructors may pick and choose in order to assemble a virtual assignment. Students must pay for access to their homework at a rate that varies based on the text they are accessing and are presented with multiple lengths of time for which they can activate their subscription, but are asked to pay more for longer subscriptions. The associated cost ranges widely, usually requiring students to pay between $15 and $70 per semester or quarter.

History
WebAssign was developed in 1997 by a small group of academics in the Department of Physics at North Carolina State University. The product was piloted in several large classes at NCSU.

WebAssign became commercially available as a hosted subscription service in January 1998 under the leadership of John Risley, a physics education specialist and professor in the Department of Physics at North Carolina State University. WebAssign became one of NC State's fastest growing spin-offs.  Feedback from instructors and students in physics, math, statistics, and chemistry is used in expanding and refining the product.

In 1998, WebAssign incorporated under the name Advanced Instructional Systems with Risley as CEO. In 2003, the company officially spun off from NCSU and moved to NCSU's Centennial Campus.

In 2012, WebAssign reincorporated as an employee-owned benefit corporation, a hybrid between a traditional stock corporation (being for profit) and a non-profit that has a social mission. WebAssign's stated benefit is education, with all company strategy and decisions dedicated to promoting, supporting, and improving education and learning.

WebAssign was named a finalist in the "Software Company" category by the North Carolina Technology Association (NCTA); the NCTA 21 Awards is North Carolina's statewide technology awards program, recognizing companies that have characterized excellence, innovation, and leadership in 21 categories.

In September 2016 Webassign was acquired by Cengage Learning.

References

American educational websites
North Carolina State University
1998 establishments in North Carolina
American companies established in 1998
2016 mergers and acquisitions
Cengage
Education companies established in 1998